María José Alvarado Muñoz (19 July 1995 – 13 November 2014) was a Honduran model, TV host and beauty pageant titleholder who was Miss Honduras 2014.

Biography
She was born on July 19, 1995, in Santa Bárbara, Honduras as María José Alvarado Muñoz. She was an actress, taking part in a TV show X-O da dinero (1959).
In December 2014 she had been scheduled to compete at the Miss World 2014 contest in London, but was murdered prior to the event.

On the night of 13 November, 2014, María José (19) and her older sister, Sofía Trinidad Alvarado Muñoz (23), disappeared after leaving a party in Santa Bárbara, Honduras.  According to witnesses she stepped into a car without license plates.

On 19 November, the same day María José had been expected to travel to London, the sisters' bodies were found. They had both been shot and buried in a field near Cablotales. Plutarco Ruiz, Sofía Trinidad's boyfriend, as well as another man, Aris Maldonado, were arrested on suspicion of kidnapping and murder of the two sisters. Ruiz confessed to the murders, stating he had shot Sofía Trinidad after an argument on the night of the party, then shot María José twice in the back as she tried to flee.

It was announced the same day that Honduras would not send a replacement to the Miss World pageant as a sign of respect for Alvarado. The chairwoman of the Miss World organization Julia Morley released a statement "to everyone around the world who has been touched by the awful news from Honduras this morning ... We are devastated by this terrible loss of two young women, who were so full of life. Our thoughts and prayers are with the family and friends of Maria Jose Alvarado and Sofía Trinidad at this time of grief". Morley also stated the Miss World pageant would hold a special memorial service for María José and her sister on 23 November. It was held.

See also
Femicides in Honduras

References

External links
María José Alvarado, Miss Honduras Mundo (obituary), elheraldo.hn; accessed 22 November 2014. 

1995 births
2014 deaths
People from Santa Bárbara Department, Honduras
Honduran models
People murdered in Honduras
Deaths by firearm in Honduras
Honduran murder victims
Honduran beauty pageant winners